In mathematics, the Virasoro algebra (named after the physicist Miguel Ángel Virasoro) is a complex Lie algebra and the unique central extension of the Witt algebra. It is widely used in two-dimensional conformal field theory and in string theory.

Definition 
These generators satisfy  and 

For a derivation of the algebra as the unique central extension of the Witt algebra, see derivation of the Virasoro algebra.

The Virasoro algebra has a presentation in terms of two generators (e.g. 3 and −2) and six relations.

Representation theory

Highest weight representations
A highest weight representation of the Virasoro algebra is a representation generated by a primary state: a vector  such that 
  

The eigenvalues take the form , where the integer  is called the level of the corresponding eigenstate.

the largest possible highest weight representation. (The same letter  is used for both the element  of the Virasoro algebra and its eigenvalue in a representation.)

A Verma module is irreducible if and only if it has no singular vectors.

Singular vectors
A singular vector or null vector of a highest weight representation is a state that is both descendent and primary.

In particular, and the reducible Verma module  has a singular vector  at the level . Then , and the corresponding reducible Verma module has a singular vector  at the level .

This condition for the existence of a singular vector at the level  is not necessary. This singular vector is now a descendent of another singular vector at the level . This type of singular vectors can however only exist if the central charge is of the type 
. 
(For  coprime, these are the central charges of the minimal models.)

Hermitian form and unitarity
The representation is called unitary if that Hermitian form is positive definite. 
Since any singular vector has zero norm, all unitary highest weight representations are irreducible.

The Gram determinant of a basis of the level  is given by the Kac determinant formula, 
 
The Kac determinant formula was stated by V. Kac (1978), and its first published proof was given by Feigin and Fuks (1984).

 
and h is one of the values 
 
for r = 1, 2, 3, ..., m − 1 and s = 1, 2, 3, ..., r.

Daniel Friedan, Zongan Qiu, and Stephen Shenker (1984) showed that these conditions are necessary, and Peter Goddard, Adrian Kent, and David Olive (1986) used the coset construction or GKO construction (identifying unitary representations of the Virasoro algebra within tensor products of unitary representations of affine Kac–Moody algebras) to show that they are sufficient.

Characters
The character of a representation  of the Virasoro algebra is the function

The character of the Verma module  is 
 
where  is the Dedekind eta function.

This singular vector generates a submodule, which is isomorphic to the Verma module .

(Then  is in the Kac table of the corresponding minimal model). The Verma module  has infinitely many singular vectors, and is therefore reducible with infinitely many submodules. This Verma module has an irreducible quotient by its largest nontrivial submodule. (The spectrums of minimal models are built from such irreducible representations.) The character of the irreducible quotient is 

This expression is an infinite sum because the submodules  and  have a nontrivial intersection, which is itself a complicated submodule.

Applications

Conformal field theory
In two dimensions, the algebra of local conformal transformations is made of two copies of the Witt algebra.
It follows that the symmetry algebra of two-dimensional conformal field theory is the Virasoro algebra. Technically, the conformal bootstrap approach to two-dimensional CFT relies on Virasoro conformal blocks, special functions that include and generalize the characters of representations of the Virasoro algebra.

String theory
Since the Virasoro algebra comprises the generators of the conformal group of the worldsheet, the stress tensor in string theory obeys the commutation relations of (two copies of) the Virasoro algebra.  This is because the conformal group decomposes into separate diffeomorphisms of the forward and back lightcones.  Diffeomorphism invariance of the worldsheet implies additionally that the stress tensor vanishes.  This is known as the Virasoro constraint, and in the quantum theory, cannot be applied to all the states in the theory, but rather only on the physical states (compare Gupta–Bleuler formalism).

Generalizations

Super Virasoro algebras

There are two supersymmetric N = 1 extensions of the Virasoro algebra, called the Neveu–Schwarz algebra and the Ramond algebra. Their theory is similar to that of the Virasoro algebra, now involving Grassmann numbers. There are further extensions of these algebras with more supersymmetry, such as the N = 2 superconformal algebra.

W-algebras

W-algebras are associative algebras which contain the Virasoro algebra, and which play an important role in two-dimensional conformal field theory. Among W-algebras, the Virasoro algebra has the particularity of being a Lie algebra.

Affine Lie algebras

The Virasoro algebra is a subalgebra of the universal enveloping algebra of any affine Lie algebra, as shown by the Sugawara construction. In this sense, affine Lie algebras are extensions of the Virasoro algebra.

Meromorphic vector fields on Riemann surfaces
The Virasoro algebra is a central extension of the Lie algebra of meromorphic vector fields with two poles on a genus 0 Riemann surface.
On a higher-genus compact Riemann surface, the Lie algebra of meromorphic vector fields with two poles also has a central extension, which is a generalization of the Virasoro algebra. This can be further generalized to supermanifolds.

Vertex algebras and conformal algebras
The Virasoro algebra also has vertex algebraic and conformal algebraic counterparts, which basically come from arranging all the basis elements into generating series and working with single objects.

History
The Witt algebra (the Virasoro algebra without the central extension) was discovered by É. Cartan (1909). Its analogues over finite fields were studied by E. Witt in about the 1930s. The central extension of the Witt algebra that gives the Virasoro algebra was first found (in characteristic p > 0) by R. E. Block (1966, page 381) and independently rediscovered (in characteristic 0) by I. M. Gelfand and Dmitry Fuchs (1968). Virasoro (1970) wrote down some operators generating the Virasoro algebra (later known as the Virasoro operators) while studying dual resonance models, though he did not find the central extension. The central extension giving the Virasoro algebra was rediscovered in physics shortly after by J. H. Weis, according to Brower and Thorn (1971, footnote on page 167).

See also

Conformal field theory
Goddard–Thorn theorem
Heisenberg algebra
Lie conformal algebra
Pohlmeyer charge
Super Virasoro algebra
W-algebra
Witt algebra
WZW model

Notes

References

.

B. L. Feigin, D. B. Fuchs, Verma modules over the Virasoro algebra  L. D. Faddeev (ed.)  A. A. Mal'tsev (ed.), Topology. Proc. Internat. Topol. Conf. Leningrad 1982, Lect. notes in math., 1060, Springer  (1984)  pp. 230–245
.
I.M. Gel'fand, D. B. Fuchs,   The cohomology of the Lie algebra of vector fields in a circle  Funct. Anal. Appl., 2  (1968)  pp. 342–343  Funkts. Anal. i Prilozh., 2 : 4  (1968)  pp. 92–93
.

 
V. G. Kac, "Highest weight representations of infinite dimensional Lie algebras", Proc. Internat. Congress Mathematicians (Helsinki, 1978), pp.299-304
V. G. Kac, A. K. Raina, Bombay lectures on highest weight representations, World Sci.  (1987) .
 & correction: ibid. 13 (1987) 260.
V. K. Dobrev, "Characters of the irreducible highest weight modules over the Virasoro and super-Virasoro algebras", Suppl. Rendiconti del Circolo Matematico di Palermo, Serie II, Numero 14 (1987) 25-42.

Conformal field theory
Lie algebras
Mathematical physics